Shut Up I Am Dreaming is the second studio album by Sunset Rubdown, released in May 2006 on Absolutely Kosher Records. It is the first album showcasing the expanded Sunset Rubdown line-up, featuring new members Camilla Wynn Ingr, Michael Doerksen, and Jordan Robson-Cramer. The album was met with critical acclaim. It was named the 27th best album of 2006 by Stylus Magazine and the 15th best on Pitchfork's Top 50 Albums of 2006.

Track listing
 "Stadiums and Shrines II" – 3:57
 "They Took a Vote and Said No" – 3:43
 "Us Ones in Between" – 4:26
 "I'm Sorry I Sang on Your Hands That Must Have Been in the Grave" – 5:32
 "Snake's Got a Leg III" – 3:52
 "The Empty Threats of Little Lord" – 5:07
 "Swimming" – 3:41
 "The Men Are Called Horsemen There" – 7:05
 "Q-Chord" – 1:21
 "Shut Up I Am Dreaming of Places Where Lovers Have Wings" – 7:23

Credits
 Recorded and engineered by Jace Lasek and Dave Smith at Breakglass Studio
 Mastered by Harris Newman at Greymarket Mastering
 Design by Matt Moroz

External links
 They Took a Vote and Said No (Free Live Recording Download from Daytrotter)
 Shut Up I am Dreaming of Places Where Lovers Have Wings (Free Live Recording Download from Daytrotter)

References

2006 albums
Sunset Rubdown albums
Absolutely Kosher Records albums